Starring Pournami is an unreleased Malayalam road movie directed by Albey, starring Sunny Wayne  Tovino Thomas and Aju Varghese in the lead roles. The film was shot in seven states of India. The first schedule started in New Delhi and finished in Manali. Second schedule was done in Ladak.
The film was later dropped due to some budget issues.

References

2010s Malayalam-language films
Films scored by Kailas Menon